Thomas Abbey (born 16 August 1993) is a Ghanaian professional football midfielder who currently plays for Malaysian club PKNP F.C. Abbey played for Malaysia Premier League club PKNP F.C.

Career
Thomas began his career at Soccer Intellectuals in 2000–2005. In the 2010–11 season, Abbey joined Hearts of Oak from divisional club Windy Professionals.

In 2018, Abbey ended his six years stay at Hearts of Oak and signed a two-year contract with Egyptian club Ismaily SC.

Ismaily SC
Abbey's contract at Ismaily SC was terminated on 1 August 2018 after reaching a mutual agreement.

PKNP FC
On 16 January 2019, Abbey signed for Malaysia Super League club, PKNP FC. He was out for weeks after picking a foot injury in the Malaysia Super League, during a Malaysia FA Cup clash with Perak FA on Saturday 12 May 2019. He underwent a successful surgery at a hospital at Ipoh.  He has scored two goals in his 16 appearances for PKNP FC in his debut season.

International
Abbey was a member of the Ghana Black Stars Team B who won the 2017 WAFU Nations Cup in Ghana.

Honours
Hearts of Oak
Ghana FA Cup runner up: 2016–17
Ismaily
Egyptian Premier League runner up: 2017–18
Individual
Hearts of Oak Player of the Month: July 2017
Sports Writers Association of Ghana Home based Player of the Year: 2017
Hearts of Oak Player Of The Year Award: 2017

References

External links
43rd SWAG Awards: Thomas Abbey is Local Male Footballer of the Year
Thomas Abbey rejects offer from Hapoel Petah Tikvah
Boxing
Thomas Abbey Is Keen To Make A Move To South Africa

1993 births
Living people
Ghanaian footballers
Accra Hearts of Oak S.C. players
Expatriate footballers in Egypt
Ghanaian expatriate sportspeople in Egypt
Ghanaian expatriate footballers
Ghana Premier League players
Association football wingers
Ghana international footballers
Windy Professionals FC players